Dichomeris tephroxesta is a moth in the family Gelechiidae. It was described by Edward Meyrick in 1931. It is found in Sikkim, India.

References

Moths described in 1931
Taxa named by Edward Meyrick
tephroxesta